The article lists all the mandals in the 33 districts of Telangana. total number is "241"

Note: Bhurgampadu, Chintoor, Kukunoor, Kunavaram, Nellipaka, Vara Ramachandra Puram and Velerupadu mandals of the district were transferred to Andhra Pradesh.

References 

 
Telangana-related lists
Lists of populated places in Telangana